Thomas Sammons may refer to:

Thomas Sammons (politician) (1762–1838), United States politician
Thomas Sammons (consul) (1853–1935), United States Consul General in Asia and Australia